Fockbek (Danish: Fokbæk) is a municipality in the district of Rendsburg-Eckernförde, in Schleswig-Holstein, Germany. It is situated approximately 5 km west of Rendsburg. Fockbek is well known throughout Schleswig-Holstein for the story of the Aalversupers (eel drowners) and is the home of the world's largest caravan manufacturer "Hobby Wohnwagen".

Fockbek is the seat of the Amt ("collective municipality") Fockbek.

People 
 Ernst Voss (1822-1920), German shipbuilder and company founder of Blohm+Voss

References

External links
 BBC's h2g2 features an article mentioning the eel drowners tale

Rendsburg-Eckernförde